Aacanthocnema is a genus of bugs from the jumping plant lice family (Triozidae). The genus is endemic to Australia, and currently contains six species, found in all states and territories with the exception of the Northern Territory.

Species 
 Aacanthocnema burckhardti Taylor, 2011
 Aacanthocnema casuarinae (Froggatt, 1901)
 Aacanthocnema dobsoni (Froggatt, 1903)
 Aacanthocnema huegelianae Taylor, 2011
 Aacanthocnema luehmannii Taylor, 2011
 Aacanthocnema torulosae Taylor, 2011

References 

Triozidae
Psylloidea genera